Iona is an unincorporated place in the Municipality of the County of Victoria, Cape Breton Island, Nova Scotia, Canada. It is named after Iona in Scotland. It is at the western end of the Barra Strait Bridge, opposite Grand Narrows.

Iona was settled by Gaelic speaking immigrants from the Isle of Barra in 1802. It is the site of Highland Village Museum (An Clachan Gàidhealach) and the Rankin School of the Narrows.

Communities in Victoria County, Nova Scotia